My Brother Is an Only Child is a 2007 Italian drama film directed by Daniele Luchetti.  It is based on an Antonio Pennacchi novel. The title comes from a song by Rino Gaetano from 1976.

Plot

Accio (Elio Germano) and Manrico (Riccardo Scamarcio) are working class brothers who live in Italy in the 1960s. While his brother becomes drawn into left-wing politics, Accio, the hotheaded younger brother, is taken under the wing of a market trader and while under his influence, joins the Fascist party. Accio ("Bully") is a nickname he is proud of because it makes him seem tough.  Manrico and their sister Violetta are alarmed to hear their brother listening to Benito Mussolini's speeches in his room. Manrico often physically torments his brother, including stuffing his head in the barrel under the drain pipe of their house.

Accio once runs away from home because his mother voted for the Houses Party.  Their house is falling apart and she thinks the Houses Party will help them rebuild it.

As Accio and Manrico get older they start demonstrating as members of the Fascist party and the Communist movement respectively.  (There are scenes of a factory occupation, and the occupation of the Rome conservatoire, where the sister is studying the cello.) The film is relatively even handed in its treatment of politics. If the young fascists seem absurd with their chanting of 'Duce! Duce!', and their actions constantly tending to violence, the communists are hardly less so: Schiller's words in the final movement of Beethoven's choral symphony are replaced by a hymn in praise of Mao Zedong, Vladimir Lenin and Joseph Stalin; a meeting of activists consists of a room full of bearded men all shouting at once and only agreeing when the time comes to shout a slogan.

Francesca, Manrico's girlfriend, becomes Accio's friend.  Accio secretly likes her and thinks that she should not stay with Manrico because "he can't be depended on".  The viewer is in little doubt that Accio is also attracted to Francesca himself. At the same time, he has himself become sexually involved with the wife of his fascist friend, the market trader, who has been imprisoned for his violent political activities. She buys him a car through an installment plan.

Eventually Accio ends up leaving the Fascist party and tearing up his membership card when party members burn his brother's car. He also breaks up with his older lover, telling her that he cares for someone else, but not replying when asked if he is loved in return.

But while Accio largely pulls out of political activism, his brother is drawn deeper into revolutionary violence. After disappearing for two years, he calls home. Accio travels to meet him and telephones Francesca, who twice quickly hangs up on him. When they meet in a cafe, Manrico sees Francesca arriving unexpectedly, but also the police who have perhaps been tailing her or tapping her telephone. He  flees but dies in an exchange of (handgun) fire with the pursuing police.

Accio then breaks into the corrupt and inefficient housing office to seize the waiting keys and the records of the homeless. He distributes keys and a party of homeless families take possession in the middle of the same night. The film ends with Accio living with his family, including his brother's small son.

Cast
 Elio Germano as Accio Benassi
 Riccardo Scamarcio as Manrico Benassi
 Angela Finocchiaro as Amelia Benassi
 Massimo Popolizio as Ettore Benassi
 Ascanio Celestini as Padre Cavalli
 Diane Fleri as Francesca
 Alba Rohrwacher as Violetta Benassi
 Vittorio Emanuele Propizio as Young Accio
 Claudio Botosso as Prof. Montagna
 Ninni Bruschetta as Segretario Bombacci  
 Anna Bonaiuto as Bella Nastri
 Luca Zingaretti as Mario Nastri
 Pasquale Sammarco as Padre Tosi
 Lorenzo Pagani as Bertini

Reception
The film received positive reviews from critics. The review aggregator Rotten Tomatoes reported that 86% of critics gave the film positive reviews, based on 63 reviews with an average rating of 7/10. Metacritic reported the film had an average score of 71 out of 100, based on 19 reviews, indicating "generally favorable reviews".

Awards
The film won four David di Donatello Awards—Best Actor (Elio Germano), Best Supporting Actress (Angela Finocchiaro), Best Screenplay, Best Editing.

References

External links
 
 
 
 
 

2007 films
2007 drama films
Films set in the 1960s
2000s Italian-language films
Films directed by Daniele Luchetti
Films set in Lazio
Italian drama films